Emathis weyersi is a species of jumping spider that occurs from Sumatra to the Philippines.

Description
The orange carapace of the female is fairly high with a flat head part. The whitish-yellow abdomen is oval and longish, with grey sides and some grey spots in the middle, the whitish-yellow legs are slender and spiny, with orange and drown hairs. The first pair of legs is more robust. The eye field is yellow, with the median frontal eyes surrounded orange and the others black.

Footnotes

References
  (2000): An Introduction to the Spiders of South East Asia. Malaysian Nature Society, Kuala Lumpur.
  (2007): The world spider catalog, version 8.0. American Museum of Natural History.

External links
 Salticidae.org: Diagnostic drawings

Salticidae
Arthropods of the Philippines
Spiders of Asia
Spiders described in 1899